Woman Against Woman is a 1938 American drama film directed by Robert B. Sinclair and written by Edward Chodorov. The film stars Herbert Marshall, Virginia Bruce, Mary Astor, Janet Beecher and Marjorie Rambeau. The film was released on June 24, 1938, by Metro-Goldwyn-Mayer.

Plot
Unhappy in his marriage, attorney Stephen Holland (Herbert Marshall) decides to get a divorce from his pretentious wife Cynthia (Mary Astor), despite concern over how it will affect Ellen (Juanita Quigley), their young daughter.

Cynthia sets out to make her ex-husband's life miserable. She first deceives Stephen's mother into siding with her, Mrs. Holland suggesting that Stephen let the little girl remain solely in Cynthia's custody for a while. Stephen must leave on a work-related trip to Washington, D.C., so he reluctantly agrees.

At a reception for his friend Senator Kingsley (Joseph Crehan), he meets Maris Kent (Virginia Bruce) and becomes smitten. They are soon married and move back to Stephen's hometown, but Cynthia conspires to ruin their lives any way she can, even having friends snub Maris at the local country club.

Away with her daughter at a remote inn, Cynthia schemes to make Stephen abandon his wife by pretending that their daughter Ellen is seriously ill and needs him. Stephen's wife and mother decide to accompany him to the inn, where all three discover a carefree Cynthia dancing while Ellen is perfectly fine. Cynthia is revealed to all what kind of person she is.

Cast 
 Herbert Marshall as Stephen Holland
 Virginia Bruce as Maris Kent
 Mary Astor as Cynthia Holland
 Janet Beecher as Mrs. Holland
 Marjorie Rambeau as Mrs. Kingsley
 Juanita Quigley as Ellen
 Zeffie Tilbury as Grandma
 Sarah Padden as Dora
 Betty Ross Clarke as Alice
 Dorothy Christy as Mrs. Morton
 Morgan Wallace as Morton
 Joseph Crehan as Senator Kingsley

References

External links 
 
 
 
 

1938 films
American drama films
1938 drama films
Metro-Goldwyn-Mayer films
American black-and-white films
Films directed by Robert B. Sinclair
1938 directorial debut films
1930s English-language films
1930s American films